Delbert Hicks (born 11 November 1983) is a Guyanese cricketer. He played in one first-class and four List A matches for Guyana in 2009.

See also
 List of Guyanese representative cricketers

References

External links
 

1983 births
Living people
Guyanese cricketers
Guyana cricketers